An interest graph is an online representation of the specific things in which an individual is interested.
Interest graphs have perceived utility and value because of the premise that people's interests are a major aspect of who they are, forming part of their personal identity, and can be used as indicators of such things as what they might want to do or buy, where they might want to go, or who they might want to meet, follow or vote for.

Relationship of interest graph to social graph

Interest graphs and social graphs are closely related, but they are not the same thing. Interest graphs are used to create people's interest networks. Where Facebook and other social networks are organized around an individual's friends, or social graph, interest networks are organized around an individual's interests, their interest graph.
Much as social graphs are maps of individuals’ social media connections that follow them across the web, interest graphs as maps of individuals’ interests can likewise follow them across the web. In this way an individual's interests, as represented in an interest graph, provide a means of further personalizing the web based on intersecting the interest graphs with web content.
Interest graphs or interest networks can in some cases be derived from social graphs or social networks and may maintain their context within that social network. These are specifically social interest graphs or interest-based social graphs.
For an interest graph to be accurate and expressive, it needs to take into account explicitly declared interests, for example "Likes" on Facebook or “Interests” in a LinkedIn profile, as well as implicit interest inferred from user activities such as clicks, comments, [tagged] photos and check-ins. Social networks are often a source for this data.

Uses of interest graph
There are a number of uses for interest graphs both from a personal and business standpoint. Interest graphs can be applied in conjunction with social graphs as a way to meet or connect to people in a social network or community who have shared or common interests, and who may not necessarily otherwise know each other.
Interest graphs can also be applied to marketing for purposes such as audience analytics and audience-based buying, for sentiment analysis, and for advertising as another form of behavioral profiling and targeting based on interests. As an example, through the use of interest graphs companies like Twitter are able to target ads more specifically based on their users’ individual interests. Interest graphs may be applied to product development by using customer interests to help determine which new features or capabilities to provide in future versions of a product.
Interest graphs have many other uses as well including simulation, research and other content discovery and filtering tasks, as input to recommendation engines for films, books, music, etc., and for learning and education.

See also 
 Community of interest
 Social web
 Social graph

References 

Social media